The 2007 Ondrej Nepela Memorial was the 15th edition of an annual senior-level international figure skating competition held in Bratislava, Slovakia. It took place between September 20 and 22, 2007 at the Ondrej Nepela Ice Rink. Skaters competed in four disciplines: men's singles, ladies' singles, pair skating, and ice dancing. The compulsory dance was the Austrian Waltz. The competition is named for 1972 Olympic gold medalist Ondrej Nepela.

Results

Men

Ladies

Pairs

Ice dancing

External links
 15th Ondrej Nepela Memorial

Ondrej Nepela Memorial, 2007
Ondrej Nepela Memorial
Ondrej Nepela Memorial, 2007